The incident at Antioch was an Apostolic Age dispute between the apostles Paul and Peter which occurred in the city of Antioch around the middle of the first century. The primary source for the incident is Paul's Epistle to the Galatians . Since the 19th century figure Ferdinand Christian Baur, biblical scholars have found evidence of conflict among the leaders of early Christianity; for example, James D. G. Dunn proposes that Peter was a "bridge-man" between the opposing views of Paul and James, brother of Jesus. The final outcome of the incident remains uncertain, resulting in several Christian views on the Old Covenant.

Gentile Christians and the Torah

Paul was responsible for bringing Christianity to Ephesus, Corinth, Philippi, and Thessalonica. According to Larry Hurtado, "Paul saw Jesus' resurrection as ushering in the eschatological time foretold by biblical prophets in which the pagan 'Gentile' nations would turn from their idols and embrace the one true God of Israel (e.g.), and Paul saw himself as specially called by God to declare God's eschatological acceptance of the Gentiles and summon them to turn to God."
According to Krister Stendahl, the main concern of Paul's writings on Jesus' role and salvation by faith is not the individual conscience of human sinners and their doubts about being chosen by God or not, but the problem of the inclusion of Gentile (Greek) Torah-observers into God's covenant.
As Gentiles began to convert from Paganism to early Christianity, a dispute arose among Jewish Christian leaders as to whether or not Gentile Christians needed to observe all the tenets of the Law of Moses.

The inclusion of Gentiles into early Christianity posed a problem for the Jewish identity of some of the early Christians: the new Gentile converts were neither required to be circumcised nor to observe the Mosaic Law. Observance of the Jewish commandments, including circumcision, was regarded as a token of the membership of the Abrahamic covenant, and the most traditionalist faction of Jewish Christians (i.e., converted Pharisees) insisted that Gentile converts had to be circumcised as well. By contrast, the rite of circumcision was considered execrable and repulsive during the period of Hellenization of the Eastern Mediterranean, and was especially adversed in Classical civilization both from ancient Greeks and Romans, which instead valued the foreskin positively.

Around the same time period, the subject of Gentiles and the Torah was also debated among the Tannaitic rabbis as recorded in the Talmud. This resulted in the doctrine of the Seven Laws of Noah, to be followed by Gentiles, as well as the determination that "Gentiles may not be taught the Torah." The 18th-century Rabbi Jacob Emden was of the opinion that Jesus' original objective, and especially Paul's, was only to convert Gentiles to follow the Seven Laws of Noah while allowing Jews to keep the Mosaic Law for themselves (see also Dual-covenant theology).

Paul objected strongly to the insistence on keeping all of the Jewish commandments, considering it a great threat to his doctrine of salvation through faith in Christ. According to Paula Fredriksen, Paul's opposition to male circumcison for Gentiles is in line with the Old Testament predictions that "in the last days the gentile nations would come to the God of Israel, as gentiles (e.g.), not as proselytes to Israel." For Paul, Gentile male circumcision was therefore an affront to God's intentions. According to Hurtado, "Paul saw himself as what Munck called a salvation-historical figure in his own right", who was "personally and singularly deputized by God to bring about the predicted ingathering (the "fullness") of the nations."

Council of Jerusalem

Paul left Antioch and traveled to Jerusalem to discuss his mission to the Gentiles with the Pillars of the Church. Describing the outcome of this meeting, Paul said that "they recognized that I had been entrusted with the gospel for the uncircumcised". The Acts of the Apostles describe the dispute as being resolved by Peter's speech and concluding with a decision by James, the brother of Jesus not to require circumcision from Gentile converts. Acts quotes Peter and James as saying:

This Apostolic Decree is still observed by the Eastern Orthodox Church.

The historical reliability of the Acts of the Apostles is disputed. While the Council of Jerusalem was described as resulting in an agreement to allow Gentile converts exemption from most Jewish commandments, another group of Jewish Christians, sometimes termed Judaizers, felt that Gentile Christians needed to fully comply with the Law of Moses, and opposed the Council's decision.

Incident
According to the Epistle to the Galatians chapter 2, Peter had traveled to Antioch and there was a dispute between him and Paul. The Epistle does not exactly say if this happened after the Council of Jerusalem or before it, but the incident is mentioned in Paul's letter as his next subject after describing a meeting in Jerusalem which some scholars consider to be the council. An alternate theory, which many believe to be better suited to the facts of the incident, is that it took place long before the Jerusalem Council, perhaps shortly after Paul's famine visit of Acts 11. This conclusion makes more sense of Peter's apparent change of heart.  says:
When Peter came to Antioch, I opposed him to his face, because he was clearly in the wrong. Before certain men came from James, he used to eat with the Gentiles. But when they arrived, he began to draw back and separate himself from the Gentiles because he was afraid of those who belonged to the circumcision group.

To Paul's dismay, the rest of the Jewish Christians in Antioch sided with Peter, including Paul's long-time associate Barnabas:
The rest of the Jews joined in this charade and even Barnabas was drawn into the hypocrisy.

The Acts of the Apostles relates a fallout between Paul and Barnabas soon after the Council of Jerusalem, but gives the reason as the fitness of John Mark to join Paul's mission.  Acts also describes the time when Peter went to the house of a gentile.  says:
The apostles and the believers throughout Judea heard that the Gentiles also had received the word of God. So when Peter went up to Jerusalem, the circumcised believers criticized him and said, "You went into the house of the uncircumcised and ate with them."

This is described as having happened before the death of King Herod (Agrippa) in 44 AD, and thus years before the Council of Jerusalem (dated c. 50). Acts is entirely silent about any confrontation between Peter and Paul, at that or any other time.

A minority of scholars argues that the confrontation was actually not between Paul and Peter, the Apostle, but another one of the identified 70 disciples of the time with the same name as Peter. In 1708, a French Jesuit, Jean Hardouin, wrote a dissertation that argues "Peter" was actually "another Peter", thus the emphasis of using the name Cephas (Aramaic for Peter). In 1990 Bart D. Ehrman wrote an article on the Journal of Biblical Literature, similarly arguing that Peter and Cephas should be understood as different people, citing the writing of Clement of Alexandria and the Epistula Apostolorum in support of his theory; Ehrman's article received a detailed critique by Dale Allison, who argued that Peter and Cephas are the same person. Nowadays, most scholars agree with Allison on the matter and Ehrman himself has partially backed down from his position, stating that he is undecided on the matter.

Outcome
The final outcome of the incident remains uncertain; indeed the issue of Biblical law in Christianity remains disputed.  The Catholic Encyclopedia states: "St. Paul's account of the incident leaves no doubt that St. Peter saw the justice of the rebuke." In contrast, L. Michael White's From Jesus to Christianity states: "The blowup with Peter was a total failure of political bravado, and Paul soon left Antioch as persona non grata, never again to return."

According to church tradition, Peter and Paul taught together in Rome and founded Christianity in that city. Eusebius cites Dionysius, Bishop of Corinth as saying, "They taught together in like manner in Italy, and suffered martyrdom at the same time." This may indicate their reconciliation. In , Paul's letters are referred to as "scripture", which indicates the respect the writer had for Paul's apostolic authority. However, most modern scholars regard the Second Epistle of Peter as written in Peter's name by another author.

See also
 Feast of Saints Peter and Paul
 New Perspective on Paul
 Proselyte

References

Bibliography

External links
  With subsection titled "The Incident at Antioch".
 Paul N. Tobin, The Incident at Antioch
 Jewish Encyclopedia: Saul of Tarsus: Paul's Opposition to the Law

1st-century Christianity
Ancient Christian controversies
Christian terminology
Judaism in the New Testament
Mosaic law in Christian theology
Saints Peter and Paul
Ancient Antioch